"The Feast and the Famine" is a song by the American rock band, Foo Fighters. It is the second song and second single from their eighth album Sonic Highways. The song was released on October 24, 2014.

Background

The song is inspired by the iconic Washington D.C hardcore punk scene, with the band having traveled to eight different U.S cities to record each song on the album Sonic Highways. The song was recorded at Inner Ear Studio in Arlington County, Virginia with gang vocals from Pete Stahl and Skeeter Thompson of  Bailey's Crossroads, Virginia punk band Scream.
The lyric acronym PMA stands for Positive Mental Attitude.

Live Performances
The song was first played live at Washington D.C's Black Cat club on October 24, 2014. Despite being a single, the song has only been played live seven times and has not been played since 2015.

Music video
During the "Washington D.C." episode of the TV series Foo Fighters: Sonic Highways,  the band performs the song at Inner Ear Studios. Like "Something from Nothing", the music video also features lyrics appearing in the background. Indie Go-Go band RDGLDGRN made an appearance at the end of the video.

Charts

References

2014 singles
2014 songs
Foo Fighters songs
Song recordings produced by Butch Vig
Songs written by Dave Grohl
Songs written by Taylor Hawkins
Songs written by Nate Mendel
Songs written by Chris Shiflett
Songs written by Pat Smear